Meryem Özyumşak (orn 10 November 1979) is a Turkish football manager and former footballer. She was a member of the  Turkey women's U19 and Turkey national teams.

Private life
Meryem Özyumşak was born in Adana on 10 November 1979.

After completing her education at Ondokuz Mayıs University in Samsun, she began to work as a teacher for Physical Education.

Club career
Inspired by her footballer brother, Özyumşak played football with boys in the school. She started her playing career with the support of her family at age 12 at Adana İdman Yurdu, the only women's football club in her hometown.  She plays in the goalkeeper position.

Apart from Adana, she played for clubs in various cities such as in Ankara, Bursa, Samsun and Istanbul. She was with the clubs Ankara Gürtaşspor, Bursa Delphi Packard Spor (1997–98), Samsungücü, (1999–2003), Marmara Üniversitesispor (2006–07), Adana İdman Yurdu (2007–08), Sakarya Yenikent Güneşspor (2008–09) and İzmit Belediyespor (2009–10). She finally returned to her initial club Adana İdman Yurdu.
After the 2002–03 season, she enjoyed the league champion title with her team Samsungücü.

She ended her active playing career at her hometown club Adana İdman Yurdu following the 2010-1 season.

International career
Özyumşak was admitted to the Turkey U19 in 1997, and appeared in one match of the 1998 UEFA Women's Under-18 Championship qualifying roun. She took part at the 2005 Summer Universiade held in İzmir, Turkey.

She became a member of the Turkeu women's national team in 2000 and between 2006 and 2010, capping ten times. She played at the UEFA Women's Euro 2001 qualifying, and the UEFA Women's Support International Tournaments.

Managerial career
In  2010, Özyumlak obtained an UEFA B coaching licance. She took part at a training course in Spain held by FC Barcelona.

She was appointed manager of her initial club Adana İdman Yurdu in the 2016-17 Turkish Women's First League. She has been managing the team since then.

Managerial statistics

Honours
 Turkish Women's Football league
 Samsungücü
 Champions (1): 2002–03

References

1979 births
Living people
Sportspeople from Adana
Ondokuz Mayıs University alumni
Turkish schoolteachers
Turkish women's footballers
Women's association football goalkeepers
Turkey women's international footballers
Turkish female association football managers
Turkish women's football managers
Marmara Üniversitesi Spor players
Adana İdmanyurduspor players